Stefano Venturelli (born 21 October 1967) is an Italian judoka. He competed at the 1988 Summer Olympics and the 1992 Summer Olympics.

References

1967 births
Living people
Italian male judoka
Olympic judoka of Italy
Judoka at the 1988 Summer Olympics
Judoka at the 1992 Summer Olympics
Sportspeople from Milan